Barlaam of Kiev (died 1065) was the first abbot of the Kiev Pechersk Lavra, serving together with Anthony of Kiev. He is regarded as a saint of the Russian Orthodox Church, with a feast day of 19 November.

In 1062, Barlaam made a pilgrimage to the Holy Land.

References

Venerable Barlaam the Abbot of the Kiev Near Caves
Диба Ю. Батьківщина Малковичів – «страна своя» преподобного Варлаама Печерського // Волинський благовісник. Богословсько-історичний науковий журнал. - Луцьк, 2013. - №1. - С.99-112 

Year of birth missing
1065 deaths
Hegumens of Kyiv Pechersk Lavra
Russian saints of the Eastern Orthodox Church
Eastern Orthodox saints from Ukraine
Burials at the Near Caves, Kyiv Pechersk Lavra
11th-century Christian saints
11th-century Rus' people
Holy Land travellers